Luke Montgomery (born ) is an American LGBT political activist, social media marketing activist, democratic digital strategist and viral video director.

Career

LGBT and HIV/AIDS activism
Having come out in his teens in the early 1990s as an outspoken LGBT rights activist, Montgomery worked for equality and was part of the team that planned the 1993 LGBT March on Washington. He was the organizer of a legislative strategy conference attended by the White House Office of National AIDS Policy and Congressman Jerrold Nadler (D-NY), and served as an alternate voting member on the D.C. Ryan White Planning Council which allocates federal funding for HIV/AIDS care, service and preventions programs. 

In 1993, Montgomery appeared in national headlines and on the talk radio circuit as "Luke Sissyfag", in a PR tactic to show other LGBT teens that anti-gay slurs cannot hurt people who are proud of who they are. The story was covered in papers from USA Today to The Sydney Morning Herald (and was discussed on the news portion of The Howard Stern Radio Show). Two years later he changed his name back to Montgomery.

On World AIDS Day in 1993, Montgomery attended a speech in Washington, D.C., by President Bill Clinton marking the occasion. Montgomery interrupted the speech and shouted at the president accusing him of not taking enough action against the disease. The protest was widely publicized and was covered in The New York Times editorial page, and Montgomery said he had staged it to remind AIDS activists of their responsibility to hold Clinton to his campaign promises. Montgomery also protested the next year at speeches by Secretary of Health and Human Services Donna Shalala and an Easter service that Clinton attended.

Montgomery founded the activist T-shirt brand FCKH8 in 2010, and over the next few years directed a series of youth-targeted viral videos taking on subjects including the bullying of LGBT teens, California's Prop 8 and to "racist police violence" in Ferguson, MO. In addition to directing FCKH8's popular "bad word for a good cause" videos, the company sold over 250,000 T-shirts with slogans against homophobia, racism and sexism.

In 2014, the New York Historical Society specially selected a FCKH8 "Some Dudes Marry Dudes, Get Over It" T-shirt designed by Luke for inclusion in its 100-year historical time capsule  so, "One hundred years from now, people are going to see how New Yorkers dressed and spoke, and what New York as a whole looked like."

Gender Equality

In 2014, Montgomery's girls' rights viral video "Potty-Mouth Princesses" spoke out to raise awareness  about gender inequality. It was named by Mashable.com as the most viewed and shared viral ad on Earth in October 2014, with over 20 million. Montgomery's cause-marketing work was described by Entertainment Tonight  as "one of the hottest topics on the planet", with Inside Edition describing it as creating a "national firestorm". Montgomery's "cussing for a cause" gender equality ad raised over $30,000 for women's charities and won the 2014 Public Interest Silver Epica Award.

Montgomery describes himself as a believer in "marketing the things that matter."

Orphanage/Humanitarian aid work

In 2006, Montgomery moved to Haiti and co-founded an AIDS orphanage for HIV+ children in the impoverished island nation. In 2010, he raised funds and volunteered in Haiti with earthquake relief efforts along with his ex-partner Nathan Guidas via Cause Commandos.

Montgomery was selected as one of The Advocate magazine's "40 Under 40" for his emergency Haiti earthquake relief work bringing food and medical supplies into the disaster zone.

Animal rights

Montgomery's work has focused on animal rights and animal welfare. He worked in Los Angeles in the late 1990s on the staff of the animal rights group Last Chance for Animals. He started a ballot initiative, "Beverly Hills Consumers for Informed Choices," to require all fur coats sold in Beverly Hills to carry a label describing how fur manufacturers put animals to death.  The initiative gathered the necessary number of signatures to appear on the ballot, but was defeated in the election.

Montgomery was s designer for Adopt-a-Pet.com, the nation's largest non-profit pet adoption web service. The site helps leads to thousands of homeless pets being adopted each day. While as director of marketing for the site, Montgomery produced and directed "The Save-A-Pet Show" starring actress Drew Barrymore.

Political activism 

In 1994, Montgomery ran for mayor of Washington, D.C. as political stunt to draw attention to AIDS issues in the city.

For the 2012 presidential election, Montgomery worked with Eduardo Cisneros (director of Silent Story) on the "Legalize Love" campaign to show broad support the president's "coming out" for marriage equality.  They covered their Volkswagen Beetle in hundreds of "Legalize Love" stickers in relation to President Obama's stance on same-sex marriage, and took a 2,400-mile trip across states that were voting on the same-sex marriage laws, including Maryland, Maine, Minnesota and Washington. The widely shared web promotion featured a viral video and a state-to-state national tour that culminated at the Democratic National Convention.

Montgomery has worked with the Humane Society of the United States and the Society for the Prevention of Cruelty to Animals of Canada.

For the 2016 presidential elections, Montgomery started a new web campaign protesting Donald Trump's ideas on deportation named "Deport Racism 2016.com". The website (www.deportracism.com) shows videos much like the "FCKH8" campaign, with children swearing and insulting presidential candidate Donald Trump.

References 

Year of birth uncertain
HIV/AIDS activists
Living people
American LGBT people
Place of birth missing (living people)
American LGBT rights activists
Year of birth missing (living people)